Box Hill School is an independent coeducational boarding and day school situated in the village of Mickleham near Dorking, Surrey, England. The school has approximately 425 pupils aged 11–18. 70 percent of students are day students while the remaining 30 percent are either weekly boarders or full boarders. Full boarding fees start at £31,950 per year and range to £40,575 per year. The school is a founding member of the Round Square Conference of Schools (an association which the school's founding headmaster Roy McComish played a vital role in the establishment and early administration of) as well as being a member of the Headmasters' and Headmistresses' Conference.

The school has offered the International Baccalaureate since September 2008 and re-introduced A levels in 2013, meaning both are now available at Sixth Form.  It is situated 40 minutes from central London on the direct Dorking and Leatherhead line. The school's patron is Constantine II of Greece. Until his death in 2018, Sir James Weatherall (first commanding officer of the Royal Navy's flagship the Ark Royal) served as warden of the school.

History

History of Dalewood House before the school
Dalewood House, the main school building, was constructed in 1883 by a local developer called Charles J Fox. The house was designed by the Victorian architect John Norton (who also designed a number of other buildings of distinction within the UK and Europe including the National Trust house Tyntesfield in Somerset). Although the house was built during the Victorian era, its design is both mock Tudor and Gothic Revival. The interior is full of hand-painted tiles, crafted stained-glass windows, and wood paneling, with fireplaces throughout. In 1890 the house was sold to David Evans (one of the nineteenth century’s pre-eminent silk printers and chairman of 'David Evans & Co'), on whose death it passed to his daughter Lucie Fosberie until 1939.  Before Box Hill School took occupation of the house it was in almost continuous private ownership by the Evans family but was converted into use as a school building after the Second World War. The house was requisitioned by the Army as the headquarters of the Pay Corps during the Second World War. In 1951 the house was taken over and run as a school by two Australian sisters.

Foundation of the school
Box Hill School was founded in 1959 by Roy McComish a house master and art master at Gordonstoun. Having decided to leave Gordonstoun and set up his own school, he contacted a number of friends and between them they bought the Dalewood House Estate for £6,000. While at Gordonstoun McComish had taught under innovative German educator Kurt Hahn who had established Gordonstoun and been involved in or had inspired the creation of a number of other schools. Box Hill became the latest Hahnian school and McComish became the school's first headmaster whilst Jocelin Winthrop Young (another of Hahn's acolytes and creator of the Round Square movement) became one of the school's first governors.

Establishment of the Round Square and later history of the school
Between 1962 and 1963 McComish and Winthrop Young listed all the schools which they considered to have adopted Hahn's ideas or had included them at their foundation, these were: in Scotland, Rannoch School and Dunrobin School, in England, Abbotsholme School, Battisborough and Milton Abbey, in Germany Louisenlund, in Switzerland Aiglon College, in Africa Achimota School, in India The Doon School and the soon to open Athenian School in California. Gordonstoun, Salem, Anavryta and Box Hill were 'taken for granted' as the already established and pre-eminent Hahnian schools.

On 5 June 1966, Kurt Hahn's 80th birthday was celebrated at Schule Schloss Salem, and the headmaster Prince Max of Baden invited Roy McComish as the headmaster of Box Hill School as well as the headmasters of Gordonstoun, Louisenlund, Anavryta, Battisborough, the Athenian School and the Atlantic college  to discuss the establishment of a Hahn schools conference. This meeting was chaired by King Constantine and during its course an agreement was reached on naming the conference 'The Hahn Schools', it was then decided that the first conference would be held at Gordonstoun in 1967. At this first conference at Hahn's insistence the name 'The Hahn Schools' was dropped in favour of a new name 'The Round Square' after an iconic building at Gordounstoun. The six schools that attended this first conference and were the founding members of the Round Square were Box Hill, Gordonstoun, Anavryta Experimental Lyceum, Schule Schloss Salem, Aiglon College and Abbotsholme School.

At the 2nd Round Square conference held at Box Hill the principles of the association were established and co-education was the first
of the sequence of conference themes that was discussed. Box Hill became an important central location for the Round Square and conferences were often held there. At the 1980 Box Hill conference R.S.I.S. (Round Square International Service) was created to promote and organise overseas voluntary service projects. Roy McComish retired as headmaster of Box Hill School in 1987 and was replaced by Dr Rodney Atwood after whom one of the school's boarding houses is named. He in turn served until 2003 before being replaced by Mark Eagers, who was replaced by the school's current headmaster Corydon Lowde in 2014.

Thirds
Each student is assigned to a group or third for competitions in music, sports and various other events. These are similar to 'houses' in other boarding schools and are separate from the actual physical Houses that each student is assigned to on arrival for pastoral reasons. The number of thirds has varied over the years, but there are currently four thirds:
 Olympians
 Spartans
 Corinthians
 Athenians

Boarding and Day Houses
Box Hill School has six boarding houses and four day houses.

Boarding Houses
 Atwood – built in 2005 and opened by Anne, Princess Royal, Atwood House was named after Box Hill School’s second headmaster, Dr Rodney Atwood. It is a purpose-built two-storey house for the senior girl and boy boarders.
 Burmester House – a Grade II listed 18th-century house purchased by Box Hill School in 1979, used as a girls' boarding house for senior girls. Burmester has a large garden, which is used by the girls during the summer months for studying, socialising and relaxing.
 Constantine – Constantine House was the first purpose-built boarding house at Box Hill School. It was opened in 1990 by the school's Patron, King Constantine II of Greece. Constantine House has its own computer room. It is a boys' boarding and day house.
 Dalewood – Dalewood House is the school's main building and was purchased in 1959. Part of the listed building also forms Dalewood boarding house, providing boarding facilities for Years 7 to 11 junior girl boarders.
 Old Cottage – Old Cottage is a Grade II listed house with parts dating back to the early 17th century. It was first used for borders in 1963. It is a senior boys' boarding house for boys from Years 12 and 13. It has a garden, which is a popular place to relax and study during the long summer days.
 Ralph - Ralph House is a boys' boarding and day house. It has a garden in the quad area used for study, BBQs and relaxing during good weather.

Day Houses
The school also has three houses which are just for day pupils from the lower and middle parts of the school (from Years 7 to 11) as well as a day house for sixth form pupils. 
Juniper (Boys year 7-11) - named for Juniper Hall
Burford (Boys year 7-11) - named for the Burford Bridge
Polesden (Girls year 7-11) - named for Polesden Lacey
Winthrop Young (Mixed 12-13) - named for Jocelin Winthrop Young, founder of the Round Square and a former governor at Box Hill

Headmasters
Roy McComish (1959 – 1987)
Rodney Atwood (1987 – 2003)
Mark Eagers (2003 – 2014)
Corydon Lowde (2014 – Present)

Performing Arts
The school runs a Performing Arts programme, adding a million-pound, purpose-built Music School in November 2009 which was opened by the Duke of Edinburgh. The Summer 2012 school play was Bugsy Malone, and in Christmas 2011 Box Hill School students performed The Crucible by Arthur Miller, directed in the round by Donna Walton and Helen Glen.  The Summer 2011 production was an open-air rendition of A Midsummer Night's Dream. The 2015 production saw pupils master a "spaghetti-house" style rendition of Twelfth Night, and more recent productions have included Cabaret, Singing in the Rain and the Great Gatsby.

Sport
The latest development of the school's campus is the addition of a multi-million pound Sports Centre which provides extensive facilities including indoor netball, 5 a side football, basketball, badminton, hockey, volleyball and tennis courts as well as cricket nets, PE teaching classroom, fitness suite and changing rooms. Outdoor there is an astroturf pitch for tennis, netball, hockey and football plus another netball and tennis court.

References

1959 establishments in England
Member schools of the Headmasters' and Headmistresses' Conference
Round Square schools
Private schools in Surrey
Boarding schools in Surrey
International Baccalaureate schools in England
Educational institutions established in the 1950s
Educational institutions established in 1959
Grade II listed buildings in Surrey
Grade II listed educational buildings
Constantine II of Greece